Arnoglossum reniforme, the great Indian plantain, is a North American species of plants in the sunflower family. It is native to the central and east-central United States primarily in the Appalachian Mountains, the Ohio/Tennessee Valley, and the Mississippi Valley. There are additional populations in the east (New Jersey, Maryland, Pennsylvania, South Carolina) and farther west in Oklahoma.

Arnoglossum reniforme is a large plant growing up to 300 cm (120 inches or 10 feet) tall. Flower heads are small but numerous, usually white or pale green. The species grows in open, wooded areas.

References

External links
Wildflowers of the United States
Plants of the Eloise Butler Wildflower Garden 
Southeastern Flora
Flora of Wisconsin
Minnesota Wildflowers

Senecioneae
Flora of the United States
Plants described in 1834